The Time Has Come (German: Es ist soweit) is a 1960 West German crime television series broadcast on ARD in six episodes. It was shot at the Bavaria Studios and on location in Britain. It was part of a group of Strassenfeger, popular crime series which cleared the streets as the entire population watched them. It was one of several Francis Durbridge adaptations to be produced in West Germany.

Cast
 Jürgen Goslar as Clive Freeman
 Eva Ingeborg Scholz as  Lucy Freeman
 Peter Pasetti as Lawrence Hudson
 Siegfried Lowitz as  Inspektor Kenton
 Ursula Kopp as  Anna 
 Karl Lieffen as Pelford
 Inge Egger as Ruth Calthorpe
 Fita Benkhoff as Barbara Barstow
 Benno Sterzenbach as  Lomax
 Hanns Ernst Jäger as  Dr. Robert Stevens
 Kurt Waitzmann as  Kommissar Wilde
 Ingeborg Christiansen as Schwester Lynn
 Gaby Jäger as Janet Freeman
 Harald Mannl as  Mr. Nelson 
 Rolf Weih as Sergeant Davis
 Willy Friedrichs as Sergeant Cross 
 Annemarie Holtz as Mrs. Denby
 Werner Lieven as Eddie
 Peter Halliday as George Harris
 Dietrich Thoms as Sergeant Brooks
 Albert Hehn as  Jack Stafford
 Klaus W. Krause as Fahrer Wade
 Wolf Petersen as  Sergeant Williams

References

Bibliography
 Martin Compart. Crime TV: Lexikon der Krimi-Serien. Bertz + Fischer, 2000.

External links
 

1960 German television series debuts
1960s crime television series
German-language television shows
German crime television series